Pecka is a village in the municipality of Osečina, Serbia. According to the 2011 census, the village has a population of 451 inhabitants.

Population

References

Populated places in Kolubara District